Eumalacostraca is a subclass of crustaceans, containing almost all living malacostracans, or about 40,000 described species. The remaining subclasses are the Phyllocarida and possibly the Hoplocarida. Eumalacostracans have 19 segments (5 cephalic, 8 thoracic and 6 abdominal). This arrangement is known as the "caridoid facies", a term coined by William Thomas Calman in 1909. The thoracic limbs are jointed and used for swimming or walking. The common ancestor is thought to have had a carapace, and most living species possess one, but it has been lost in some subgroups.

Caridoid facies
Calman identified the following features as distinguishing eumalacostracan crustaceans:
"Carapace enveloping the thoracic region;  movably stalked eyes; biramous first antenna; scale-like exopod on the second antenna; natatory exopods on the thoracic limbs; elongate, ventrally flexible abdomen; tail fan formed by the lamellar rami of the uropods on either side of the telson."

Classification
Martin and Davis present the following classification of living eumalacostracans into orders, to which extinct orders have been added, indicated by †.

The group as originally described by Karl Grobben included the Stomatopoda (mantis shrimp), and some modern experts continue to use this definition. This article follows Martin and Davis in excluding them; they are placed in their own subclass, Hoplocarida.

Subclass Eumalacostraca Grobben, 1892 
 Superorder Syncarida Packard, 1885 
 †Order Palaeocaridacea
 Order Bathynellacea Chappuis, 1915 
 Order Anaspidacea Calman, 1904 (including Stygocaridacea)
 Superorder Peracarida Calman, 1904
 Order Spelaeogriphacea Gordon, 1957 
 Order Thermosbaenacea Monod, 1927 
 Order Lophogastrida Sars, 1870 
 Order Mysida Haworth, 1825 
 Order Mictacea Bowman, Garner, Hessler, Iliffe & Sanders, 1985 
 Order Amphipoda Latreille, 1816 
 Order Isopoda Latreille, 1817
 Order Tanaidacea Dana, 1849 
 Order Cumacea Krøyer, 1846 
 Superorder Eucarida Calman, 1904
 Order Euphausiacea Dana, 1852 
 Order Amphionidacea Williamson, 1973 
 Order Decapoda Latreille, 1802
 †Order Angustidontida

References

Malacostraca
Taxa named by Karl Grobben
Arthropod subclasses